

Édouard René Lefèbvre de Laboulaye (18 January 1811 – 25 May 1883) was a French jurist, poet, author and anti-slavery activist. In 1865, he originated the idea of a monument presented by the French people to the United States that resulted in the Statue of Liberty in New York Harbor. He got the idea thinking that this would help strengthen their relationship with the United States.

Life 
Laboulaye was received at the bar in 1842, and was chosen professor of comparative law at the Collège de France in 1849. Following the Paris Commune of 1870, he was elected to the national assembly, representing the departement of the Seine. As secretary of the committee of thirty on the constitution he was effective in combatting the Monarchists in establishing the Third Republic. In 1875, he was elected a life senator, and in 1876 he was appointed administrator of the Collège de France, resuming his lectures on comparative legislation in 1877. Laboulaye was also chairman of the French Anti-Slavery Society and president of the Société d'économie politique.

Always a careful observer of the politics of the United States, and an admirer of its constitution, he wrote a three-volume work on the political history of the United States, and published it in Paris during the height of the politically repressed Second Empire. During the American Civil War, he was a zealous advocate of the Union cause and the abolition of slavery, publishing histories of the cultural connections of the two nations. At the war's conclusion in 1865, he became president of the French Emancipation Committee that aided newly freed slaves in the U.S. The same year he had the idea of presenting a statue representing liberty as a gift to the United States, a symbol for ideas suppressed by Napoleon III. The sculptor Frédéric Auguste Bartholdi, one of Laboulaye's friends, turned the idea into reality.

Writing
Laboulaye wrote poetry in his spare time. One of his poems, "L'Oiseau bleu" was set by Victor Massé. Laboulaye also translated into French the autobiography of Benjamin Franklin and the works of Unitarian theologian William Ellery Channing.

Laboulaye published many books. Those relating to the United States include:

Political History of the United States (3 vols., 1855–1866)
The United States and France (1862)
Paris en Amerique (1863) translated into English by Mary Louise Booth
The Poodle-Prince (Le Prince Caniche) (1868) translated into English by Mary Robinson in 1895

Popular culture
 Laboulaye was an important historical figure in the 2007 film National Treasure: Book of Secrets.

See also
 Laboulaye, Córdoba, a city in Argentina named in his honour.

References

References and further reading

 (short biography of life and works)

External links

 Lyric by Laboulaye
 
  
 
 The Statue of Liberty Laboulaye brought to NYC 

1811 births
1883 deaths
Politicians from Paris
French Roman Catholics
Members of the National Assembly (1871)
French life senators
French classical liberals
19th-century French historians
19th-century French lawyers
19th-century French poets
19th-century jurists
19th-century Roman Catholics
Christian abolitionists
French abolitionists
French jurists
French poets
Statue of Liberty